Hélder Barros is a Santoméan economist, diplomat and former minister of economic affairs in São Tomé and Príncipe. He was a candidate for the presidency of his country in 2011 and 2016.

In his early twenties Hélder Barros contributed to the struggle for independence of the archipelago by hosting radio programs for the independence movement from Libreville, Gabon.

He graduated with a M.Econ. from California Coast University, and joined the UN in 1982 in Niger. In the following decade he worked interchangeably in the head office in New York, and with conflict resolution in several African countries under the mandate of the organization. Baros was coordinator for the United Nations Office for Project Services in northern Iraq and subsequently returned to Africa as Special Assistant for the United Nations mission in Angola (2002-2003), and between 2008 and 2014 he was Head of Office for the UN mission in the Democratic Republic of Congo. In 2014 Barros began postgraduate studies in International Relations at the London School of Economics.

He was minister of economic coordination between 7 July 1994 and 25 October 1994 and again from 26 September 2001 to 28 March 2002 in the governments led by Evaristo de Carvalho from Independent Democratic Action.

References

External links

News article
Hélder Barros anuncia candidatura às presidenciais de Julho próximo (''Helder Barros Announced his Candidate for the Presidentials Next July, TVS, 17 June 2016, accessed on 8 October 2016 

Year of birth missing (living people)
Government ministers of São Tomé and Príncipe
Living people
São Tomé and Príncipe politicians
São Tomé and Príncipe economists